Rinchinbal Khan (Mongolian: Ринчинбал , ; Emperor Ningzong of Yuan, ; May 1, 1326 – December 14, 1332), was a son of Kuśala who was briefly installed to the throne of the Yuan dynasty of China, but died soon after he was installed to the throne. Apart from Emperor of China, he is also considered the 14th Great Khan of the Mongol Empire, although it was only nominal due to the division of the empire.

Biography
He was the second son of Kuśala (Emperor Mingzong) and a younger brother of Toghun Temür (Emperor Huizong). His mother was Babusha of the Naiman tribe, who met Kusala when he lived in exile in Central Asia under the Chagatai Khanate.

When his father Kuśala died and was succeeded by his younger brother Tugh Temür (who is thought to have poisoned Kuśala), Rinchinbal was appointed to Prince of Fu. Tugh Temur made his son Aratnadara heir apparent in January 1331. In order to secure her son's throne, Tugh Temur's Khatun Budashiri executed Rinchinbal's mother, Babusha, and exiled Toghan Temur to Korea. These proved unnecessary, however, Aratnadara died one month after his designation as heir.
 
Although Tugh Temür had a son named El Tegüs when he died in 1332, it is said that on his deathbed the Khagan expressed remorse for what he had done to his elder brother and his intention to pass the throne to Toghan Temur, Kusala's eldest son, instead of his own son. The grand councilor El Temür resisted letting Kuśala's eldest son Toghun Temür accede to the throne since he was suspected of having poisoned his father Kuśala. When Tugh Temur's widow and El Tegüs's mother Budashiri Khatun respected Tugh Temür's will of making Kuśala's son succeed the throne, the 6 year old Rinchinbal was chosen. While Toghun Temür was kept far away from the capital Dadu, Rinchinbal was in Dadu and had become favored by Tugh Temür. Rinchinbal was enthroned as the new emperor on October 23, 1332, but he died on December 14.

El Temür again asked Budashiri to install El Tegüs but it was declined again. He had no choice but to invite Toghun Temür back from far-away Guangxi in southwest China.

Ancestry

See also
 List of emperors of the Yuan dynasty
 List of Mongol rulers
 List of rulers of China

References

Footnotes

Citations 

Great Khans of the Mongol Empire
Yuan dynasty emperors
14th-century Chinese monarchs
14th-century Mongol rulers
1326 births
1332 deaths
Monarchs who died as children
Child monarchs from Asia
Yuan dynasty Buddhists
Chinese Buddhist monarchs
Mongolian Buddhist monarchs